Pai (Burmese: ပါယ်) is a small town in northern Thailand's Mae Hong Son Province, near the Myanmar border, about 146 km (91 mi) northwest of Chiang Mai on the northern route to Mae Hong Son. It lies on the Pai River. The town has thesaban tambon status and covers parts of the tambon Wiang Tai of Pai District. As of 2006, it had a population of 2,284.

Access
Pai is on Route 1095, which connects Mae Hong Son with Chiang Mai. Pai Airport, which had been decommissioned for 20 years, was paved and refurbished in 2005-2006, and on 1 February 2007, Siam General Aviation began daily passenger service to and from Chiang Mai International Airport which lasted until 2014. Later, until 2017, Kan Air operated the same route using a Cessna 208. Both airlines went out of business.

Tourism and development
Pai was once a quiet market village inhabited by Shan people (ethnic Tai) whose culture is influenced by Myanmar (formerly called Burma). Today, Pai primarily thrives on tourism. Mostly a hippie destination, it is filled with hot springs. Known among backpackers for its relaxed atmosphere, the town is full of cheap guesthouses, souvenir shops, and restaurants. In the environs of the town are spas and elephant camps. Further outside of town, there are several waterfalls and a number of natural hot springs varying in temperature from 27-39 °C (80–102 °F).  Some resorts tap the hot springs and feed hot water into private bungalows and public pools. As Pai lies at the foot of the mountains, some tourists use it as a base for trekking and visiting hill tribes like Karen, Hmong, Lisu, and Lahu. Another notable attraction is the town's Wednesday Market which brings large crowds of local villagers and tribal people from all around the Pai Valley. Tourists are also attracted by Shandicun village (Chinese village) located in the outskirts of the town.

Recently Pai has appeared on the Thailand tourist map and has received major infrastructure upgrades including an airport with several daily flights, nine (9) 7-Elevens, several small- to medium-size luxury resorts, totaling more than 350 accommodation properties, several live music clubs, beer bars, and three sets of traffic lights. It has led to an influx of business investment and land speculation by both farang (Western Caucasians) and big city Thais. While some hail these changes as a new age of prosperity for Pai, others point to the loss of Pai's traditional customs and culture.

In the tourist high season of November through March there are large numbers of tourists. Prior to 2006, foreign tourists predominated, but now Thai tourists are catching up in numbers, particularly after Pai was featured in two popular Thai-made romantic movies, The Letter: Jod Mai Rak (2004) and Ruk Jung (2006). During high season, tourist numbers swell to the point that Pai experiences traffic jams, as well as shortages of electricity, water, and petrol.

Pai hosts music festivals as well as staging an international Enduro championship. Pai Canyon (Kong Lan) is nearby.

Attraction sites 
Some of the top attraction sites in Pai, Thailand include:

 Pai Canyon: This attraction site offers a scenic view of the surrounding countryside and is a great spot for hiking.
 Tham Lot cave: This is a 1.6-kilometer cave system with Nam Lang River flowing through it and has rock formations like stalactites and stalagmites.
 Pai Memorial Bridge: This historic bridge was built by Japanese soldiers during World War II.
 Tha Pai Hot Springs
 Pam Bok Waterfall
 Pai Land Split
 Wat Phra That Mae Yen

History
The area of modern-day Pai has been inhabited for more than 5,000 years.  About 2,000 years ago, the Lua (or Lawa) Tribe was the dominant ethnic group over all of the area of today's northern Thailand, and a few of their descendants still live in villages only about 20 km away from Pai.

The recorded history of the area starts about 800 years ago with the establishment of a settlement (today known as Ban Wiang Nuea) about 3 km north of modern-day Pai.  Ban Wiang Nuea was founded in 1251 AD by Shan immigrants from the region of modern-day northern Myanmar.  Due to the area's remoteness and seclusion, people in those times were mainly cut off from news of the outside world and therefore not much concerned with the politics of Lanna and the rest of Thailand.  That changed drastically in the course of the 14th and 15th centuries, when the first settlers arrived from Chiang Mai. It was part of Lanna policy of the time to send citizens loyal to the Lanna throne to the outposts of the empire, in order to consolidate and affirm Lanna's territorial authority. The result was a conflict that eventually led to a series of wars over territorial dominance in the Pai area. The Lanna troops finally defeated the Shan soldiers in 1481, forcing them to retire to Myanmar territory. The Shan families who had lived in the area for a long time, establishing households, farming their land and raising their families, were granted permission to stay by the Lanna prince, along with a certain degree of cultural and social autonomy under the law and authority of the Lanna kingdom.  Ban Wiang Nuea as a result became a village sharply divided into two parts by a wall into a "Shan" part and a "Lanna" part.

In the second half of the 19th century, colonial powers France and England, who had already established their influence in Vietnam, Cambodia, Laos, and Burma, were viewing the area of modern-day Thailand with increasing interest. To consolidate Siam's influence and authority in the northern border region, the royal house encouraged Northern Thais from provinces like Payao, Lamphun, and Nan to migrate to those areas.  The result again was conflict: the last fight between Lanna Thai and Shan in Ban Wiang Nuea took place in 1869, when Lanna soldiers finally defeated their Shan opponents in a battle that ended with the total destruction of the village. The entire village was burnt to the ground.  All structures standing in Ban Vieng Nuea today are the result of the subsequent rebuilding efforts of the villagers.

There was already a "road" (that took up to a week to traverse) leading from Chiang Mai to Pai in the late-19th century. This settlement was known as Ban Wiang Tai, and it developed into the modern town we know as Pai. Many of the new immigrants chose to settle in the area along the connecting network of trails to Mae Hong Son.

In 1943, the Japanese began several projects to create efficient troop and equipment transport routes between Thailand and Myanmar in support of their planned attacks on Imphal and Kohima. In addition to the well-known Death Railway through Kanchanaburi, one of these projects was the improvement of the existing road from Chiang Mai to Pai and the patchwork of trails on to Mae Hong Son. The method of crossing the Pai River about 10 km south-east of the City of Pai is not, at present, verifiable. A bridge at that site was erected after the war and erroneously named the "World War II Memorial Bridge". It was apparently erected (and subsequently twice extended) in the course of road improvement projects by the Thai government. The Japanese attempt to develop a road connection between Chiang Mai to Pai and on to Mae Hong Son was abandoned in early 1944 when it became evident that the improvements could not be completed in time for the scheduled attack on Imphal. The uncompleted road did serve as an avenue of retreat for the Japanese after their disastrous defeat at Imphal and Kohima.

In 1967, the Thai government started developing the road leading from Chiang Mai via Pai to Mae Hong Son, known today as Route 1095, but didn't finish paving the route until the early- to mid-1990s.

Pai's recent history is one of waves of migration: in addition to the waves of old Shan and Lanna immigrants, Karen immigrants arrived in the 18th century, Lisu and Lahu people from areas of southern China arrived in the early 20th century, Muslim families from Chiang Mai began arriving to establish trading businesses starting around 1950, a group of Kuomintang fleeing Mao Zedong established a community in Pai in the early 1960s, and, finally, a new wave of refugees from the Shan State of Burma arrived in the past few decades, fleeing the turmoil caused by the Burmese junta to work as laborers in Thailand.

Floods of 2005
Pai suffered a huge mudslide and severe flooding in 2005, resulting in major structural damage to homes, resorts, storefronts, and bridges.  The town had almost completely recovered by the time the 2006 high season began.

Controversy over police conduct
Although it is a sleepy town in the mountains, Pai has over the past decade generated an unusual amount of controversy (even for Thailand) concerning the conduct of local police, as well as the conduct of Thai drug enforcement police operating there. This is partially due to the proximity of Pai to drug routes from the Shan State in Burma. However, given the post-2000 rise in incidents involving foreign tourists, it is evident that other factors are also at work. Some examples of this clear long-term trend in Pai include:

 On December 24, 2001, the local Pai police arrested and jailed the owner of Bebop Bar, with the rather dubious explanation that he was "letting people dance in a place of business not officially licensed as a disco."  After this event, both Bebop and Mountain Blue received additional discriminatory treatment in the form of illegal or uneven application of Thailand's closing-time laws. The so-called "dancing ban" by the Thai Police became a famous and well-known joke which business owners were still talking about years later.
 Also in 2001, and again in 2003, Pai district officials and police began enforcing several illegal measures ostensibly aimed at increasing "safety" for the local tourists, specifically "a 'recommendation' via illegal denial of permits whereby all guesthouses must have walls made from a solid material, such as wood, gypsum, compressed fibre or cement" rather than the cheaper and more traditional bamboo favored by many guesthouse owners and low-budget backpackers.  Most locals suspected other motives were involved, including both a desire to "weed out" low-budget tourists and to encourage higher-priced construction that would generate higher construction kickbacks. Several locals pointed out uneven enforcement of these laws for different businesses, depending on personal relationships with the police or district officials.
 The so-called "War on Drugs" launched in February 2003 by former (now deposed) Prime Minister Thaksin Shinawatra, in which "more than 2,000 people in Thailand were killed as the government effectively declared 'open season' on those accused of involvement in the drug trade,", took a heavy toll on Pai district and downtown Pai in particular. Many locals whose family members were murdered without investigation now take an extremely skeptical view of any police action here.
 In 2006, Pai Police purchased a new mobile drug testing vehicle, and there have been numerous reported instances of the police entering bars and other establishments and randomly urine-testing foreign tourists. In many of these cases it is apparent that the searches were not performed legally.  In Thailand, "when requesting urinalysis for drug identification purposes, at least one member of the Narcotics Suppression Police must be present. Regular Thai police do not have this right, nor do the Tourist Police. Second of all, there must be probable cause.".
 On 5 January 2008, Pai made national and international news when an off-duty police officer, Sgt-Major Uthai Dechawiwat, fatally shot Canadian tourist Leo John Del Pinto, and shot and wounded a second Canadian tourist Carly Reisig, fleeing the scene immediately after the event.  Nearly all involved believe that both the policeman and victims were drunk at the time. Official police reports differ widely from eyewitness reports and it is expected that the officer will be acquitted by the Thai Justice system.  In an extremely unusual development which highlights the deep integrity issues that exist with the Pai police, reporter Andrew Drummond published an editorial in The Nation where he expressed his regrets for publishing views from all sides of the story in his earlier Nation article because:
"While the facts presented were true, they have been wrongly taken in a malicious way by many...What the journalist cannot convey sometimes is his opinion of whether the witnesses are telling the truth or show immediately what links these witnesses have to the police....I am very concerned at several aspects of this case:

 In a January 2008 editorial published in CityLife Chiang Mai (submitted in December 2007), anonymous author "A Tourist" eerily anticipates the January 2008 shooting in his/her strongly worded objection to excessive police actions in Pai:
"I have noticed another significant change over the last year, which is the reason for writing this letter. The method of law enforcement in this small town needs to be seriously examined....I accept that changes are necessary. I also agree that noise pollution should be carefully monitored and controlled, as should drug abuse and any other illegal acts or unpleasant kinds of behaviour, but we ought not to be scared to leave our homes or guesthouses!...One Saturday in particular remains in my memory, where several police officers decided to inspect a party at a bar in town. I believe that they were looking for drugs. I along with many other tourists was especially shocked to see that one officer was carrying a machine gun...This kind of behaviour is likely to scare tourists and leave very negative impressions on them with regards to Pai town as a holiday destination...The police are also actively confiscating other vehicles, testing individuals at random for drugs and alcohol abuse, detaining owners of restaurants and bars for remaining open past the agreed time, and generally making a lot of noise in a relatively quiet town that did not appear to have many problems beforehand....The increased police presence is clearly visible and does not, in my opinion, make Pai town look like a place one would like to visit. There is also a general feeling of unrest here and I feel that it is quite obvious to the tourist travelling through. The police are unapproachable and menacing. This has a strong negative impact on the atmosphere here in Pai town. The previously friendly and welcoming town appears to have changed into a place where everyone is afraid to even walk down the street in case they are accused of doing something wrong. Should the police not be employed to protect civilians? Should they not be approachable in case I or someone else requires some help? They are certainly not even close to doing what a police force is meant to do."

Gallery

See also
Banana Pancake Trail

References

External links

Populated places in Mae Hong Son province